William Reynold Johnson (October 21, 1930 – May 30, 2009) was an American judge and politician. He served as a member of the New Hampshire Senate and as a justice of the New Hampshire Supreme Court.

Life and career 
Johnson was born in Excelsior, Minnesota. He attended Dartmouth College and Harvard Law School. He served in the United States Army.

In 1964, Johnson was elected to the New Hampshire Senate. In the same year, he was chairperson of the New Hampshire Republican Party, serving until 1966.

In 1985, Johnson was appointed to serve as a justice of the New Hampshire Supreme Court, serving until 1999.

Johnson died in May 2009 in Roanoke Rapids, North Carolina, at the age of 78.

References 

People from Excelsior, Minnesota
New Hampshire state senators
Chairpersons of the New Hampshire Republican State Committee
20th-century American politicians
Justices of the New Hampshire Supreme Court
20th-century American judges
Dartmouth College alumni
Harvard Law School alumni
1930 births
2009 deaths